Svalbarðsstrandarhreppur, also named Svalbarðsströnd , is a municipality located in northern-central Iceland, in Northeastern Region. Its seat is in the village of Svalbarðseyri. In 2020, mayor Björg Erlingsdóttir proposed the idea of a merger with the other municipalities of Eyjafjörður.

References

External links 
Official website 

Municipalities of Iceland